Halkyn Common and Holywell Grasslands is a Site of Special Scientific Interest in Flintshire, north Wales covering Halkyn Mountain and surrounding areas. It lies 4 km north-west of Mold on a plateau about 100–300 m above sea-level. It includes 699.3 hectares of grassland, heathland and other open vegetation with numerous spoil tips and quarries. The site is notable for populations of plants such as spring sandwort and stemless thistle and amphibians such as the great crested newt.

See also
List of Sites of Special Scientific Interest in Flintshire

References

Geography of Flintshire
Sites of Special Scientific Interest in Clwyd